David Thomas Gipp (born 13 July 1969) is an English former professional footballer who played as a forward in the Football League for Brighton & Hove Albion.

Career
Gipp started his career as an apprentice at Brighton & Hove Albion and was a regular goalscorer for the reserve side. He made his first team debut in April 1987 in a 1–1 draw with Blackburn Rovers, coming on as a substitute and almost scoring with his first touch. He only made a further four league appearances before he was released in July 1989.  He later joined Football Conference side Barnet who were managed by Barry Fry, but failed to break into the starting lineup on a regular basis, only making thirteen league appearances and scoring three times as the side finished as runners-up. During the 1989–90 season he was loaned out to divisional rivals Fisher Athletic and Wycombe Wanderers, and also a short period at Chelmsford City. In August 1990, Southern League Premier Division side Wealdstone broke their transfer record with a £15,000 bid to sign Gipp. He later played for a number of non-league teams across the southern counties before retiring. His final game was for Whitehawk on 24 August 2004, when he scored in a 3–1 win against Southwick.

Personal life
After his professional football career finished he became an East End independent market trader. He lived in Barkingside with his wife Tracey and three children, Jack and Megan and Billy. Gipp is an Arsenal supporter.

References

1969 births
People from Forest Gate
English footballers
Association football forwards
Brighton & Hove Albion F.C. players
Barnet F.C. players
Fisher Athletic F.C. players
Wealdstone F.C. players
Chelmsford City F.C. players
Wycombe Wanderers F.C. players
Chesham United F.C. players
Southwick F.C. players
Whitehawk F.C. players
Harrow Borough F.C. players
Braintree Town F.C. players
Aveley F.C. players
St Albans City F.C. players
Worthing F.C. players
English Football League players
National League (English football) players
Living people